Tekin Dereli (November 30, 1949) is a Turkish theoretical physicist.

Life and academic career

He studied at Ankara Science High School and the Middle East Technical University.

He was an associate professor and a Professor of Physics at Middle East Technical University (1984–1987,  1993–2001); professor at Faculty of Science at Ankara University (1987–1993), Leverhulme Visiting Professor at Lancaster University UK (2000–2001)  and since 2001, he is a professor at the department of physics at Koç University.

TUBITAK honored him with TUBITAK Junior Science Price in 1982 and TUBITAK Science Price in 1996. He also was awarded prestigious Turkish prizes for science by "Sedat Simavi Trust"  in 1989 and "Prof. Mustafa Parlar Foundation" in (1993).

He is a member of Turkish Academy of Sciences (TAS) since 1993.

He is married with two children.

Research interests

His research interests are Yang-Mills gauge theories, supersymmetry, supergravity, quaternion and octonion algebras, spin structures, generalised theories of gravity, cosmological solutions, integrable systems and phase space quantisation.

References
 Biography at Koc University

External links
 Web page at Koc University

1949 births
Living people
People from Ankara
Middle East Technical University alumni
Academic staff of Middle East Technical University
Academic staff of Ankara University
Academic staff of Koç University
Turkish physicists
Theoretical physicists
Recipients of TÜBİTAK Science Award
METU Mustafa Parlar Foundation Science Award winners
20th-century physicists
21st-century physicists